This is a list of senators who were members of the Senate of Ceylon.

Presidents of the Senate

 Gerard Wijeyekoon (1947 - )
 Nicholas Attygalle (1952 - 1955)
 Cyril de Zoysa (1955 - 1961)
 Sarath Wijesinghe (1962 - 1965)
 Thomas Amarasuriya (1963–65)
 Abeyratne Ratnayaka (1965 - 1971)

Deputy presidents of the Senate

 Peri Sundaram (1947 - )
 Frank Gunasekera (1948 - 1951)
 Cyril de Zoysa (1951 - 1955)
 Adeline Molamure (1955 - )
 B. H. Dunuwille
 S. D. S. Somaratne

Leaders of the Senate
 Edwin Wijeyeratne (1947-1951)
 Oliver Goonetilleke (1951-1954)

Senators

 N. M. Appuhamy, elected UNP 
 Kurbanhusen Adamaly (1949–61), appointed.
 J. A. Amaratunga, appointed
 Thomas Amarasuriya (1953–65), UNP/SLFP
 Nicholas Attygalle (1952-), appointed
 A. M. A. Azeez (1952–63), appointed, UNP/independent
 Sirimavo Bandaranaike (1960–65), SLFP
 I. A. Cader (1969-1970), appointed
 Mohamed Shums Cassim (1953–54), elected
 C. Coomaraswamy (1947-1950), appointed
 Cissy Cooray (1947-1952), appointed - first woman appointed to the Senate
 Ananda Dassanayake (1961-), elected
 R. S. F. de Mel (1947-), elected
 Evadne de Silva
 Evelyn de Soysa (1958-1963),
 M. W. H. de Silva
 Cyril de Zoysa (1947-), elected
 M. P. de Zoysa (1960-1971), appointed
 Doric de Souza, LSSP
 B. H. Dunuwille
 Sam Peter Christopher Fernando
 Chittampalam Abraham Gardiner (1947-), appointed
 Oliver Goonetilleke (1947-1948;1951-1954), appointed
 Frank Gunasekera (1947-), appointed
 A. R. M. Hameem (1963-1969), appointed
 L. L. Hunter (1950-1953), appointed
 Sir Herbert Eric Jansz (1947-1950), appointed
 J. P. Jayasena
 Ukwatte Jayasundera
 A. P. Jayasuriya
 Clodagh Jayasuriya, UNP, elected (October 1953 – 1956)
 N. U. Jayawardena, appointed (1957-)
 Valentine S. Jayawickrema
 Stanley Kalpage
 S. R. Kanaganayagam (1949–57), appointed, UNP/ACTC
 E. W. Kannangara
 M. D. Kitchilan (1965-1971), appointed
 John Kotelawala, UNP
 Justin Kotelawala (1947-1954), elected, UNP
 Dr R. B. Lenora
 M. Manickam, ITAK
 Mohamed Macan Markar (1947-1952), appointed
 S. M. H. Mashoor (1965-1971), elected
 Adeline Molamure (1947-), elected
 S. Z. Mashoor Moulana (1967), elected
 S. Nadarajah (1965–71), ACTC
 S. Nadesan (1947–71)
 S. Natesan (Subaiya Nadesapillai)
 Ponnambalam Nagalingam (1951–57), LSSP
 E. M. V. Naganathan (1947-), elected, ACTC/ITAK
 Jinadasa Niyathapala, appointed 1960-1964 
 James Peter Obeyesekere III
 Bertram Ivor Palipane (1952–57), elected
 Sangarapillai Pararajasingham, UNP (1954-)
 M. V. P Peiris
 D. W. J. Perera (1947-), elected

 Reginald Perera (1959–71), MEP
 D. M. Rajapaksa
 Lalitha Rajapakse (1947-), appointed
 A. B. Rajendra (1947-), appointed

 Abeyratne Ratnayaka
 Barnes Ratwatte Dissawe (1947-), elected
 Harris Leuke Ratwatte Dissawe (1955-), elected
 Abdul Rahman Abdul Razik (1947-1952), elected
 Philip Rodrigo
 Dr. V. R. Schockman (1947-), appointed
 H. de Z. Siriwardena (1952-), appointed 
 Seetha Seneviratne (1967-)
 Robert Singleton-Salmon (1950-1951), appointed
 Bennet Soysa (1947-), elected
 Peri Sundaram (1947-), elected, CIC
 John Tarbat (1947-), appointed
 M. Tiruchelvam (1965–71), ITAK
 Heen Banda Udurawana
 Kanthiah Vaithianathan
 Donatius Victoria (1947-), appointed
 A. F. Wijemanne 
 Sarath Wijesinghe, elected (1947-), elected President of the Senate (1963-)
 Gerard Wijeyekoon (1947-), appointed
 Edwin Wijeyeratne (1947-1951), appointed
 E. B. Wikramanayake
 G. P. Wickramarachchi (1947-1960), appointed
 T. Y. Wright (1947-), appointed

Notes

References